Menato Boffa (4 January 1930 in Benevento, Italy – 28 September 1996) was an Italian racing driver.

Boffa raced in Formula Junior in 1960, and the following year, he entered four non-championship Formula One races with a Cooper T45. In the poorly attended 1961 Vienna Grand Prix he qualified fourth and was classified fifth, albeit 14 laps down on the winner. At Syracuse he started 17th and finished ninth, seven laps down. However, in Naples he retired on lap five after an accident with Keith Greene, and later in the year he failed to qualify for the Modena Grand Prix where he was 3.5 seconds slower than pole-sitter Stirling Moss. The following week, he was on the entry list for the 1961 Italian Grand Prix but withdrew before the event. After the 1961 season, Boffa moved away from Formula One and did not participate at that level again.

Complete Formula One World Championship results
(key)

Non-championship Formula One results
(key)

References

1930 births
1996 deaths
Sportspeople from Benevento
Italian racing drivers
Italian Formula One drivers